Mike Sainristil (born October 3, 2000) is an American football wide receiver and defensive back for the Michigan Wolverines.

Early years and high school career
Sainristil was born in Port-au-Prince, Haiti, in 2000. His father, Carlot, was the newsroom director at a radio station and received threats after the 2000 Haitian presidential election. As a result, the family fled from Haiti when Sainristil was seven months old.

The family settled in Everett, Massachusetts, where Sainristil attended Everett High School. He was the Gatorade Player of the Year in Massachusetts during the 2018–19 academic year.

College career
In November 2018, he committed to play college football at the University of Michigan. He enrolled early and turned heads in Michigan's 2019 spring practice. Michigan's defensive coaches sought to use him as a cornerback, but the offensive staff won out in having him as a wide receiver.

Despite his strong showing in spring practice, Sainristil saw limited time as a true freshman and caught only one pass for eight yards in the first seven games. He had a breakout game against Notre Dame on October 26, 2019, making three receptions for 73 yards and his first collegiate touchdown.

With the departure of receivers Donovan Peoples-Jones, Tarik Black, and Nico Collins, Sainristil played a larger role in Michigan's offense during the 2020 season.

In 2022, Sainristil was moved to defensive back. During the 2022 regular season, he ranked second on the team with 31 solo tackles and also had seven pass breakups, four-and-a-half tackles for loss, and two quarterback sacks.

College statistics

References

External links
Michigan Wolverines Bio

2000 births
Living people
American football wide receivers
Michigan Wolverines football players
Sportspeople from Port-au-Prince
Haitian players of American football